Richard A. Pettigrew (born June 10, 1930) was an American politician in the state of Florida.

Pettigrew was born in Charleston, West Virginia in 1930, and moved to Florida with his family that same year. He attended the University of Florida and is an attorney. He served in the Florida House of Representatives for the 97th district, as a Democrat, serving from 1963 to 1972. From 1971 to 1972, he was Speaker of the Florida House of Representatives.

References

Living people
1930 births
Members of the Florida House of Representatives
Politicians from Charleston, West Virginia
Politicians from Miami
Speakers of the Florida House of Representatives